Tang Qianting (唐钱婷，born 14 March 2004) is a Chinese swimmer. She competed in the women's 100 metre breaststroke at the 2020 Summer Olympics.

Personal bests

Long course (50-meter pool)

Short course (25-meter pool)

Key: NR = National Record ; AS = Asian Record

References

External links
 

2004 births
Living people
Chinese female breaststroke swimmers
Olympic swimmers of China
Swimmers at the 2020 Summer Olympics
Swimmers from Shanghai
Medalists at the FINA World Swimming Championships (25 m)
21st-century Chinese women